The 2019–20 St. Bonaventure Bonnies men's basketball team represented St. Bonaventure University during the 2019–20 NCAA Division I men's basketball season. The Bonnies, led by 13th-year head coach Mark Schmidt, played their home games at the Reilly Center in Olean, New York as members of the Atlantic 10 Conference. They finished the season 19–12, 11–7 in A-10 play to finish in a tie for fifth place. Their season ended when the A-10 tournament and all other postseason tournaments were canceled due to the ongoing coronavirus pandemic.

Previous season 
The Bonnies finished the 2018–19 season 18–16, 12–6 in A-10 play to finish in fourth place. In the A-10 tournament, they defeated George Mason and Rhode Island before losing in the championship game to Saint Louis. The Bonnies did not participate in a postseason tournament.

Offseason

Departures

Incoming transfers

2019 recruiting class

Roster

Schedule and results

|-
!colspan=12 style=| Exhibition

|-
!colspan=12 style=| Non-conference regular season

|-
!colspan=12 style=| <span style=>Atlantic 10 regular season

|-
!colspan=12 style=| Atlantic 10 tournament

References

St. Bonaventure Bonnies men's basketball seasons
St. Bonaventure
2019 in sports in New York (state)
2020 in sports in New York (state)